The Miracle of Love is a new religious movement based in Denver, Colorado. Miracle of Love now goes by the name Center of The Golden One. Until 2010, it was headed by two leaders, Kalindi La Gourasana and The Lady. The group's stated mission is to break people free from the cycle of birth and death and bring them home to God in this lifetime.  The central guidance on how to do this derives from the teachings of the Gourasana.

History
The Miracle of Love was started in 1987 by David Swanson, his wife Carole Seidman (who took the name Kalindi) and The Lady, and several other persons.  This is when the benevolent Being Gourasana is believed to have entered David Swanson's body as "an Incarnation of God manifesting on Earth".  After David Swanson's death in 1995, Gourasana is said to have begun speaking through Kalindi. Kalindi died on April 18, 2010

A trademark request for "Gourasana Meditation Practice" was filed in 1996 by Church of Exodus in San Diego, California.

The 2009 press release says that the seminar was first offered in San Diego, California, in 1991, and that over 5,000 people had participated since then at locations in the U.S., Europe, South America, and Australia.

Philosophy
The Miracle of Love teaches that this material plane of existence is one of duality, with inevitable pain, suffering, and death, to which we are locked by our attachments, and these attachments cause us to be reborn in a cycle of reincarnation.

The Miracle of Love teaches that people can break free of this cycle and achieve full union with God in this lifetime by surrendering the ego and separate will to God, following the guidance of the leaders, giving in service, and using the special assistance provided by Lord Gourasana in the Gourasana Meditation Practice to break material and conceptual attachments.

It has been described by the Pacific Sun newspaper as having aspects of a large group awareness training (LGAT) group.

References

External links
 Miracle of Love official website

Churches in Colorado
New religious movements